The Billboard Hot 100 is a chart that ranks the best-performing singles of the United States. Its data, published by Billboard magazine and compiled by Nielsen SoundScan, is based collectively on each single's weekly physical and digital sales, as well as airplay and streaming. At the end of a year, Billboard will publish an annual list of the 100 most successful songs throughout that year on the Hot 100 chart based on the information. For 2019, the list was published on December 5, calculated with data from November 24, 2018 to November 16, 2019. 

Post Malone ranked as Billboards top Hot 100 artist of 2019. Of his five songs on the list, "Sunflower" (with Swae Lee) ranked the highest, as the number-two song of the year.

Year-end list

See also
 2019 in American music
 List of Billboard Hot 100 number-one singles of 2019
 List of Billboard Hot 100 top 10 singles in 2019

References

United States Hot 100 Year end
Billboard charts
2019 in American music